is a railway station on the Hohi Main Line operated by JR Kyushu in Aso, Kumamoto, Japan.

Lines

Layout 
The station consists of a side platform serving a single track at grade. There is no station building, only a shelter on the platform for waiting passengers.

Adjacent stations

History
Japanese National Railways (JNR) opened the station on 10 March 1960 as an additional station on the existing track of the Hōhi Main Line. With the privatization of JNR on 1 April 1987, the station came under the control of JR Kyushu.

JR Kyushu has commenced repair work, starting first with the sector from Higo-Ōzu to Tateno but has not announced a targeted completion date. The track east and west of Ichinokawa has been damaged in several places but the station itself appears to have escaped serious damage.

See also
List of railway stations in Japan

References

External links
Ichinokawa (JR Kyushu)

Railway stations in Kumamoto Prefecture
Railway stations in Japan opened in 1960